H57 or H-57 may refer to :
 H-57 (Michigan county highway)
 H-57 Sea Ranger, a military designation for the Bell 206 helicopter
 , a Royal Navy H-class destroyer
 H57, an Intel 5 Series chipset